Reasi railway station is a proposed railway station in Reasi district, Jammu and Kashmir. Its code is REASI. It will serve Reasi city. The station consists of 2 platforms. The station lies on Jammu-Baramulla line. The Work on this rail line is expected to be finished by August 2022.

See also
 Anji Khad Bridge
 Chenab Bridge

References

Railway stations in Reasi district
Firozpur railway division
Proposed railway stations in India